The Paloh railway station is a Malaysian train station located at and named after the town of Paloh, Kluang District, Johor. The current Paloh station has been demolished for a new elevated station as part of the Gemas-Johor Bahru double-trakcing and electrification project.

See also
 Rail transport in Malaysia

Kluang District
KTM ETS railway stations
Railway stations in Johor